Derrick Moncrief (born June 25, 1993) is a professional gridiron football linebacker for the Saskatchewan Roughriders of the Canadian Football League (CFL).

College career
Moncrief played college football for the Mississippi Gulf Coast Bulldogs in 2012 and 2013, the Auburn Tigers in 2014 and the Oklahoma State Cowboys in 2015 and 2016.

Professional career

Saskatchewan Roughriders
Moncrief was signed by the Saskatchewan Roughriders of the CFL on June 3, 2017, and played in his first professional football game on August 13, 2017. He had a career-best 73 tackles in 2019 and was named to the CFL All-Star team.

Las Vegas Raiders
On January 10, 2020, Moncrief signed a reserve/future contract with the Las Vegas Raiders of the National Football League (NFL). He was waived on May 11, 2020.

Los Angeles Rams 
Moncrief signed with the Los Angeles Rams on August 25, 2020. He was waived on September 4, 2020, and re-signed to the practice squad two days later. He was elevated to the active roster on October 31 for the team's week 8 game against the Miami Dolphins, and reverted to the practice squad after the game. He was placed on the practice squad/COVID-19 list by the team on December 22, 2020, and restored to the practice squad on December 26. He signed a reserve/future contract on January 29, 2021. He was waived on August 17, 2021.

Edmonton Elks
On September 7, 2021, it was announced that Moncrief had signed with the Edmonton Elks. He played in nine games for the Elks where he had 23 defensive tackles and four sacks.

Saskatchewan Roughriders (II)
On February 8, 2022, it was announced that Moncrief had signed with the Saskatchewan Roughriders.

References

External links
 Saskatchewan Roughriders bio 
 

1993 births
Living people
People from Prattville, Alabama
Players of American football from Alabama
American football linebackers
Canadian football linebackers
Auburn Tigers football players
Oklahoma State Cowboys football players
Saskatchewan Roughriders players
Las Vegas Raiders players
Los Angeles Rams players
Edmonton Elks players